The Sylvia Plath effect is the phenomenon that poets are more susceptible to mental illness than other creative writers. The term was coined in 2001 by psychologist James C. Kaufman, and implications and possibilities for future research are discussed. The effect is named after Sylvia Plath, who died by suicide at the age of 30.

Building on the more general research that, from early adolescence through adulthood, women are twice as likely as men to experience depression,  Kaufman's work further demonstrated that female poets were more likely to experience mental illness than any other class of writers. In addition, female poets were more likely to be mentally ill than other eminent women, such as politicians, actresses, and artists.

Although many studies (e.g., Andreasen, 1987; Jamison, 1989; Ludwig, 1995) have demonstrated that creative writers are prone to mental illness, this relationship has not been examined in depth. 

Kaufman himself wrote an editorial for Europe’s Journal of Psychology classifying his essay as inaccurate and stated "As I matured and studied more aspects of creativity, I was less thrilled about the Sylvia Plath Effect legacy [...] I made several arguments against the importance of my own work".

Plath's illness and suicide have spawned many articles in scientific journals, but almost all have been focused on issues of psychodynamic explanation and have been unsuccessful in dealing directly with the clinical history and diagnosis. Undeniably, the view has been broadly proliferated that hers was a typical manic-depressive illness.

Supporting evidence
In one study, 1,629 writers were analyzed for signs of mental illness. Female poets were found to be significantly more likely to experience mental illness than female fiction writers or male writers of any type. Another study extended the analysis to 520 eminent women (poets, fiction writers, non-fiction writers, visual artists, politicians, and actresses), and again found the poets to be significantly more likely to experience mental illness.

In another study performed by the Department of Psychiatry at the University of Kentucky Medical Center, female writers were found to be more likely to suffer not only from mood disorders, but also from panic attacks, general anxiety, drug abuse, and eating disorders. The rates of multiple mental disorders were also higher among these writers. Although it was not explored in depth, abuse during childhood (physical or sexual) also loomed as a possible contributor to psychological issues in adulthood. The cumulative psychopathology scores of subjects, their reported exposure to abuse during childhood, mental difficulties in their mothers, and the combined creativity scores of their parents represented significant predictors of their illnesses. The high rates of certain emotional disorders in female writers suggested a direct relationship between creativity and psychopathology, but the relationships were not clear-cut. As the results of the predictive analysis indicated, familial and environmental factors also appeared to play a role.

Sylvia Plath and her death
After several suicide attempts, John Horder (her close friend) felt Plath was at risk of further harm and prescribed her anti-depressants mere days before Plath took her own life. He also visited with her daily and made many attempts to have her admitted to a hospital. Upon her refusal, he made arrangements for a live-in nurse.

Some critics have argued that because anti-depressants usually take up to three weeks to take effect, her prescription from Horder may not have been of any help. Others say that Plath's American doctor had warned her never again to take the anti-depressant drug prescribed by Horder as it was found to worsen her depression, but he supposedly prescribed it under a proprietary name which she did not recognize.

Plath, on February 11, 1963, was found dead of carbon monoxide poisoning in her kitchen after putting her head in the oven. She sealed the rooms between the kitchen and her sleeping children with wet towels and cloths.

List of writers with mental illness

Female writers
 Iris Chang (1968–2004), journalist and writer 
 Elise Cowen (1933–1962), poet
 Florbela Espanca (1894–1930), poet
 Petya Dubarova (1962–1979), poet
 Charlotte Perkins Gilman (1860–1935), novelist and poet
 Ingrid Jonker (1933–1965), poet
 Sarah Kane (1971–1999), playwright
 Alda Merini (1931–2009), poet
 Christiana Morgan (1897–1967), artist, author, and psychologist
 Alejandra Pizarnik (1936–1972), poet
 Sylvia Plath (1932–1963), poet and novelist
 Assia Wevill (1927–1969), poet 
 Sanmao (1943–1991), writer and translator
 Anne Sexton (1928–1974), poet
 Sara Teasdale (1884–1933), poet
 Marina Tsvetayeva (1892–1941), poet
 Virginia Woolf (1882–1941), novelist, short-story writer, and essayist
 Kay Sage (1898–1963), poet

Male writers
 Marcel Proust (1871–1922), novelist, poet, and short-story writer
 Ryūnosuke Akutagawa (1892–1927), short-story writer
 John Berryman (1914–1972), poet
 Richard Brautigan (1935–1984), novelist, poet, and short-story writer.
 Hart Crane (1899–1932), poet
 Osamu Dazai (1909–1948), novelist and short-story writer
 F. Scott Fitzgerald (1896–1940), novelist, essayist, screenwriter, and short-story writer
 Ernest Hemingway (1899–1961), novelist, short-story writer, and journalist
 Arthur Koestler (1905–1983), novelist and essayist
 Ross Lockridge Jr. (1914–1948), novelist
 Guy de Maupassant (1850–1893), short-story writer, novelist, and poet
 Gérard de Nerval (1808–1855), poet, short-story writer, and translator
 Friedrich Nietzsche (1844–1900), philosopher, poet and composer
 Breece D'J Pancake (1952–1979), short-story writer
 Antero de Quental (1842–1891), poet
 Delmore Schwartz (1913–1966), poet and short-story writer
 Edward Stachura (1937–1979), poet
 Dylan Thomas (1914–1953), poet
 John Kennedy Toole (1937–1969), novelist
 David Foster Wallace (1962–2008), novelist, short-story writer, and essayist
 Andrew Waterhouse (1958–2001), poet and musician
 Franz Kafka (1883–1924), novelist and short-story writer
 Robert E. Howard (1906–1936), novelist and short-story writer

See also 
 Creativity and mental illness
 Doki Doki Literature Club!, a game about poetry and mental illness

References

Further reading 

 

Sylvia Plath
Creativity and mental illness